Chris Burns may refer to:
Chris Burns (Canadian football) (born 1972), former Canadian football player
Chris Burns (footballer) (born 1967), English soccer player and team manager
Chris Burns (politician), Australian politician and current member of the Northern Territory Legislative Assembly